Togafau is a surname. Notable people with the surname include: 

Malaetasi Togafau (1946–2007), Attorney General of American Samoa
Pago Togafau (born 1984), American football player